The Men's Windy City Open 2015 was the men's edition of the 2015 Windy City Open, which was a PSA World Series event (prize money: 150 000 $). The event took place at the University Club of Chicago in the United States from 26 February to 4 March. Nick Matthew won his second Windy City Open trophy, beating Mohamed El Shorbagy in the final.

Prize money and ranking points
For 2015, the prize purse was $150,000. The prize money and points breakdown is as follows:

Seeds

Draw and results

See also
Women's Windy City Open 2015
Metro Squash Windy City Open

References

External links
PSA Windy City Open 2015 website
Windy City Open 2015 SquashSite page
Windy City Open 2015 official website

Windy City Open
Windy City Open
Windy City Open